The William & Mary Police Department (WMPD) is a nationally accredited police department with jurisdiction over The College of William & Mary located in Williamsburg, Virginia, United States. The department's accreditation with the Virginia Law Enforcement Professional Standards Commission was awarded on February 9, 2001.

The department is located on campus in the office area of the parking garage at 201 Ukrop Way near Swem Library. Its emergency response operates 24 hours a day, 365 days per year.

The department has 20 full-time police officers, 2 part-time police officers, and 1 Auxiliary Officer. The officers are complemented in their duties by five dispatchers and 1 unarmed security officer. The department also employs one investigator. The force is headed by Chief Deborah Cheesebro. On September 15, 2014, Cheesebro became the first female police chief in William & Mary's 321-year history.

WMPD officers have jurisdiction and legal authority on all university-owned property and work closely and share jurisdiction with the Williamsburg Police Department, the James City County Sheriff's Department and other law enforcement agencies.

References

External links
WMPD website

School police departments of Virginia
University and college police forces of the United States
Police